Consensual homicide refers to a case when one person kills another, with the consent of the person being killed.

Assisted suicide

The most common form of consensual homicide is assisted suicide, most commonly as euthanasia, in which terminally ill people seek assistance from their doctors (or family members) to alleviate their suffering by ending their lives. This practice is legal in some jurisdictions, but remains controversial because of the legal, ethical and practical issues it raises.

Exceptional cases
Suspected serial killer John Bodkin Adams claimed that his patient Edith Alice Morrell—whose murder he was tried for in 1957—had wanted to die. He was controversially found not guilty but later suspected of murdering up to 163 of his patients.

In 1996 a Maryland entrepreneur named Sharon Lopatka arranged for her own torture and strangulation over the Internet. In 2001, Armin Meiwes from Germany was found to have murdered and cannibalized a willing victim he found over the internet. These two cases attracted considerable media attention. Beyond their lurid sexual details, both cases introduce paradoxes about the respective responsibility of the parties, the legal differences between consensual homicide and suicide.

In 2005, Japan, Hiroshi Maeue lured three people using the internet with promises to assist in their suicides, and strangled them. They may have consented to their killings at first, but the method was different from his promise of death by carbon monoxide poisoning. Maeue had previous convictions and his motivation was clearly sexual. He was regarded as a serial killer and was sentenced to death.

Other types 

 Seppuku, the traditional Japanese method of suicide, in many cases works as consensual homicide. The assistant, called a kaishakunin, performs a mercy kill on the samurai committing suicide. If the assistant is not present, the ritual can devolve into a slow, messy death.

In popular culture 

 Consensual mutual homicide of a male-female couple is the theme of Pedro Almodóvar's movie Matador. The word "matador" is traditionally used for bullfighters (also a theme of the movie), but literally means "killer". 
 Consensual homicide is also a theme in the 2009 novel Dark Places, written by Gillian Flynn.
 It is also seen in the 2008 film Downloading Nancy, loosely based on the consensual murder of Sharon Lopatka by Robert Glass.

See also
 Sadomasochism
 Snuff film
 Suicide by cop

References

Homicide
Suicide methods
Euthanasia
Killings by type